This is a list of members of the South Australian House of Assembly from 1965 to 1968, as elected at the 1965 state election:

Members of South Australian parliaments by term
20th-century Australian politicians